The Route du Rhum is a single person transatlantic yacht race. The 1994 race was the 5th edition and had eight classes with 35 boats taking part.

Results

External links
 
 Official YouTube Channel

References

Route du Rhum
1994 in sailing
Route du Rhum
Single-handed sailing competitions
IMOCA 60 competitions